Maurice Fishberg (August 16, 1872 – August 30, 1934) was a Jewish-American physical anthropologist who specialised in the ethnology of the Jews. Fishberg was born in Kamenetz Podolsky (now Ukraine) and died in New York City.

Works
Physical Anthropology of the Jews (1902)
 
Jews: A Study of Race and Environment (1911)

References

1872 births
1934 deaths
American anthropologists
Jewish anthropologists